These are the Netherlands' motorways by their national number, listed with the most important towns at or near the roads. The numbers start with 'A' for 'autosnelweg' (motorway in Dutch). Some of these also carry one or more European E-road numbers on (sections of) their trajectory. Although E-roads in the Netherlands are virtually all motorways, the trajectories are frequently not the same.

Motorways

Former motorways
The following routes lost their motorway-status:
 A205: A9 - Haarlem-West (current N205)
 A68: Haelen - Roermond-West (current N280)
 A261: Tilburg - Loon op Zand (current N261)

See also 
Transport in the Netherlands
List of controlled-access highway systems
Evolution of motorway construction in European nations
List of E-roads in the Netherlands

References

External links

Rijkswaterstaat

 
Motorways